Holland & Holland were a London firm of coachbuilders active over the century before the First World War. Their showroom was at 254 Oxford Street West and their works at 10, 25 to 27 and 45 North Row between Grosvenor Square and Oxford Street.

Holland & Holland products ranging from carriages through to coaches and limousine motor-bodies were built to exceptionally high standards often for clients in other countries.

In the second half of the 19th century (there was a surplus of coaches, they were no longer built for commercial passenger transport following the advent of the railways) Holland & Holland developed a high reputation for the manufacture of Park Drag or Private Coaches for their rich sporting clientele, those gentlemen who wished to drive their own four-in-hand teams for pleasure.

In the early 20th century they were listed as electric carriage builders.

In 1912 Holland & Holland was purchased by neighbours and competitors, Thrupp & Maberly.

References

External links
 1892 Road Coach at Bonhams

Coachbuilders of the United Kingdom
Vehicle manufacture in London
Manufacturing companies disestablished in 1912
1912 disestablishments in England
British companies disestablished in 1912